Stéphane Lalaoui (born 15 April 1981) is a French former professional footballer who played as a midfielder.

Career 
Lalaoui played professionally for Chamois Niortais between 2004 and 2006. He joined Aurillac on a free transfer on 8 July 2009 from Rouen.

References

External links
 Stéphane Lalaoui profile at foot-national.com
 
 

1981 births
Living people
French footballers
Association football midfielders
Olympique Lyonnais players
FC Rouen players
Chamois Niortais F.C. players
Lyon La Duchère players
Football Bourg-en-Bresse Péronnas 01 players
FC Aurillac Arpajon Cantal Auvergne players
ES Paulhan-Pézenas players
AS Béziers (2007) players
Championnat National 2 players
Championnat National 3 players
Championnat National players
Ligue 2 players
Division d'Honneur players